Brooks Thomas Lee (born February 14, 2001) is an American professional baseball shortstop in the Minnesota Twins organization.

Amateur career
Lee attended San Luis Obispo High School in San Luis Obispo, California. As a freshman, he batted .438, and as a junior, he hit .462. As a senior in 2019, he batted .405 with 13 doubles and 25 RBIs over 23 games. He was considered a top prospect for the 2019 Major League Baseball draft, but withdrew his name the day before, telling teams he would fulfill his commitment to attend California Polytechnic State University, San Luis Obispo to play college baseball for the Cal Poly Mustangs. He was still selected by the San Francisco Giants in the 35th round as a courtesy pick. After graduating, he spent the summer playing in the West Coast League for the Corvallis Knights, and was named the league's top prospect after hitting .333 with three home runs, 35 RBIs, and 12 stolen bases over 43 games.

During the first semester of Lee's freshman year, he hyperextended his knee, and underwent surgery. He missed the beginning of the 2020 season due to recovery, and appeared in only two games before the college baseball season was cancelled due to the COVID-19 pandemic. That summer, he played in the Northwoods League for the Willmar Stingers. In 2021, as a redshirt freshman, Lee played in 55 games in which he slashed .342/.411/.626 with ten home runs, 57 RBIs, and 27 doubles (a Cal Poly record). He committed a total of six errors over the course of the season for a .974 fielding percentage. He was named an All-American by various media outlets and was named the Big West Conference Co-Field Player of the Year as well as the Big West Conference Co-Freshman Field Player of the Year. He was also a finalist for the Brooks Wallace Award. Following the season's end, he spent time playing in the Cape Cod Baseball League for the Yarmouth–Dennis Red Sox. Over 21 games, he batted .405/.432/.667 with six home runs. He was also named to the USA Baseball Collegiate National Team with whom he spent part of the summer. Lee entered the 2022 season as a top prospect for the upcoming draft. Over 58 games, he slashed .357/.462/.664 with 15 home runs, 55 RBIs, and 25 doubles and was named Big West Field Player of the Year for the second straight season. He was also awarded the Brooks Wallace Award. Following the season's end, he traveled to San Diego where he participated in the Draft Combine.

Professional career
The Minnesota Twins selected Lee in the first round with the eighth overall selection of the 2022 Major League Baseball draft. He signed with the team for $5.6 million.

Lee made his professional debut with the Rookie-level Florida Complex League Twins and was promoted to the Cedar Rapids Kernels of the High-A Midwest League after four games. After 25 games with Cedar Rapids, he was promoted to the Wichita Wind Surge of the Double-A Texas League. Over 31 games between the three teams, he slashed .303/.388/.451 with five home runs and 15 RBIs.

Personal life
Lee's father, Larry, is the head baseball coach at Cal Poly. He is named after Brooks Robinson.

References

External links

Cal Poly Mustangs bio

2001 births
Living people
People from San Luis Obispo, California
Baseball players from California
Baseball shortstops
Cal Poly Mustangs baseball players
Yarmouth–Dennis Red Sox players
United States national baseball team players
All-American college baseball players
Cedar Rapids Kernels players
Wichita Wind Surge players